Rønneberg is a Norwegian surname. Notable people with the surname include:

Anton Johan Rønneberg (1856–1922), Norwegian politician for the Liberal Party
Anton Rønneberg (1902–1989), Norwegian writer, theatre critic, dramaturg and theatre director
Erling Rønneberg (1923–2008), Norwegian politician for the Labour Party
Joachim Rønneberg (1919–2018), Norwegian Army officer and broadcaster
Joachim Holmboe Rønneberg (1851–1929), Norwegian politician
Kristian Rønneberg (1898–1982), Norwegian politician for the Farmers' Party

Norwegian-language surnames